Wallace Olins CBE (19 December 1930 – 14 April 2014) was a British practitioner of corporate identity and branding. He co-founded Wolff Olins and Saffron Brand Consultants and was the chairman of both. Olins advised many of the world's leading organisations on identity, branding, communication and related matters including 3i, Akzo Nobel, Repsol, Q8, The Portuguese Tourist Board, BT, Renault, Volkswagen, Tata and Lloyd's of London. He acted as advisor both to McKinsey and Bain. He pioneered the concept of the nation as a brand and has worked on branding projects for a number of cities and countries, including London, Mauritius, Northern Ireland, Poland, Portugal, and Lithuania.

Biography

Olins was educated at Highgate School in north London. After studying history at St. Peter's College, Oxford he went into advertising in London. His first big job was as head of the agency that became Ogilvy and Mather in Mumbai, where he lived for five years.

He returned to London and in 1965 co-founded Wolff Olins with Michael Wolff, and was the chairman. He founded Saffron Brand Consultants in 2001 with Jacob Benbunan, an ex-colleague from Wolff Olins.

He was a visiting professor at many Business Schools around the world and spoke on branding and communications issues globally. Olins died at the age of 83 on 14 April 2014.

Awards and recognition
Olins was appointed a CBE in 1999. He was nominated for the Prince Philip Designers Prize in 1999 and received the Royal Society of Arts’ Bicentenary Medal in 2000. He was given the D&AD President's Award in 2003 and the Reputation Institute's first ever Lifetime Achievement Award in 2006. Olins was an Honorary Fellow of St. Peter's College Oxford and in 2013 was awarded an Honorary Professorship at UPC in Lima, Peru.

Books
Over 250,000 copies of his books have been sold in 18 languages, including the seminal works ‘Corporate Identity’, 'On Brand', and 'The Brand Handbook'. His last book, 'Brand New – The Shape of Brands to Come', was published by Thames & Hudson in April 2014.
"Brand New – The Shape of Brands to Come" 2014
"Wally Olins -The Brand Handbook" 2008
"Wally Olins – On Brand" 2003
"Trading Identities" 1999
"The New Guide to Identity" 1995
"Corporate Identity" 1989
"The Corporate Personality: an inquiry into the nature of corporate identity" 1978

References

External links
WallyOlins.com 
Wally Olins, 2007 (video): "The Nation as Brand"
 Interview with Wally Olins on design and emotion
 Wally Olins at the Corporate Identity Gipfel in Konstanz on 26. March 2010 
 The Brand called Wally Olins, AdWeek 
 Design & Emotion 
 Huge opportunity exists on Branding India 
 Brand Poland 
 Reuters, What's Right with India 
 Financial Times, Wally Olins, brand expert, 1930–2014 
 Saffron Brand Consultants, Wally Olins CBE, 1930–2014 
 The Times, Wally Olins 

1930 births
2014 deaths
British advertising executives
Branding consultants
Commanders of the Order of the British Empire
People educated at Highgate School
Alumni of St Peter's College, Oxford
Academic staff of Copenhagen Business School